HMS Sapphire was an  built for the Royal Navy at Devonport Dockyard and launched on 24 September 1874.

She commenced service on the Australia Station in August 1875. She left the Australia Station in July 1879 and returned to England and was refitted and rearmed. After refit she commissioned for the China Station in 1883 until 1890. She returned to Plymouth and was paid off.

Fate 
She was sold on 24 September 1892 to G. Cohen.

See also 
 Sapphiretown, South Australia

Notes

Footnotes

Bibliography 
 
 Bastock, John (1988), Ships on the Australia Station, Child & Associates Publishing Pty Ltd; Frenchs Forest, Australia. 
 
 

 

1874 ships
Ships built in Plymouth, Devon
Amethyst-class corvettes
Victorian-era corvettes of the United Kingdom